Rinorea crenata is a species of plant in the Violaceae family. It is found in Costa Rica and Panama.

References

crenata
Near threatened plants
Taxonomy articles created by Polbot
Taxobox binomials not recognized by IUCN